Still Mine is a 2012 Canadian romantic drama film. The film had a limited release under its original title Still at the 2012 Toronto International Film Festival; it had a general release on May 3, 2013. Written and directed by Michael McGowan and based on a true story, the film stars James Cromwell as Craig Morrison, a farmer in rural St. Martins, New Brunswick who battles a government bureaucrat (Jonathan Potts) for the right to build a new house for his ailing wife Irene (Geneviève Bujold) when their existing home no longer suits her health needs.

The international distribution rights were licensed by Cinema Management Group.

Cast
 James Cromwell as Craig Morrison
 Geneviève Bujold as Irene Morrison
 Chuck Shamata as Judge
 Ronan Rees as Gavin
 Julie Stewart as Ruth
 Rick Roberts as John
 George R. Robertson as Chester Jones
 Hawksley Workman as Gus
 Joe Pingue as Food Terminal Employee
 Jonathan Potts as Rick Daigle
 Zachary Bennett as Jeff Leblanc
 Barbara Gordon as Margaret Jones
 Campbell Scott as Gary Fulton

Reception
Still Mine received mostly positive reviews. On Rotten Tomatoes, the film holds a 94% score rating, sampled from 62 critics' reviews. Its consensus reads: "James Cromwell and Geneviève Bujold are outstanding in this tender, affecting, insightful drama about the bonds and sacrifices of marriage." It holds a rating of 72 out of 100 at Metacritic, indicating "generally favorable reviews".

The New York Times reviewer Stephen Holden wrote that the film has a "spiky integrity. Dry-eyed and observant, it refuses to pity Craig and Irene Morrison...Mr. Cromwell, who is more than a decade younger than his character, lends Craig a compelling depth, intelligence and resoluteness. He stands about 6-foot-7, and with a Roman nose on a head that seems chiseled out of rock, radiates an imperial authority. Miss Bujold, alert and birdlike, imbues Irene with a starchy tenacity and a sharp sense of humor."

The Washington Post reviewer Michael O'Sullivan wrote "Interwoven with McGowan’s plot about the little guy vs. big government is an even more engaging and nuanced tale of romance. It contributes to an unflashy, quietly stirring dramatic experience. As Craig and Irene, Cromwell and Bujold deliver a pair of superb performances."

Awards and nominations
The film garnered seven nominations at the 1st Canadian Screen Awards, including Best Picture, Best Actor (Cromwell), Best Actress (Bujold), Best Original Screenplay (McGowan), Best Cinematography (Brendan Steacy), Best Editing (Roderick Deogrades) and Best Original Score (Hugh Marsh, Don Rooke and Michelle Willis). Cromwell won the award for Best Performance by an Actor in a Leading Role.

References

External links

2012 films
Canadian romantic drama films
Films set in New Brunswick
Films directed by Michael McGowan
2012 romantic drama films
Films shot in New Brunswick
Films shot in Ontario
English-language Canadian films
2010s English-language films
2010s Canadian films